Fântânele is a commune in Arad County, Romania. The commune is situated on the Vingăi Plateau, on the left bank of the Mureș River. It is composed of two villages: Fântânele (situated 10 km from Arad) and Tisa Nouă (Wiesenheid; Réthát). It also included Aluniș and Frumușeni villages until 2004, when they were split off.

Population
According to the 2002 census, the population of the commune is 5692 (4975 Romanians, 378 Hungarians, 159 Slovaks, 112 Germans, 31 Romani and 29 others.

History
The first documentary record of Fântânele dates back to 1457, while Tisa Nouă to 1135.

Economy
Although the economy of the commune is prevalent agricultural, grain, technical crops and fodder-plant growing are widespread, vegetable growing and cattle raising are also practised, and the secondary and tertiary economic sectors have also developed recently.

Tourism
The locality is included in the area with cultural value of national interest.
In Fântânele village one can visit the Roman Catholic church called "Îngerul Păzitor" (1780) and the Kover-Appel castle dating
back to the 19th century with its surrounding park and architectural complex.

References

Communes in Arad County
Localities in Romanian Banat
Former Danube Swabian communities in Romania